Call of Cthulhu Miniatures is a line of miniatures published by Grenadier Models.

Contents
Call of Cthulhu Miniatures were numerous sets of miniatures suitable for Call of Cthulhu.

Reception
Frederick Paul Kiesche III reviewed Call of Cthulhu Miniatures in Space Gamer No. 73. Kiesche commented that "I give these miniatures, despite my reservations, a hearty recommendation. These creeping horrors and the brave souls who fight them have definitely captured my interest and have started to gnaw at my soul."

Kevin Ross reviewed the Cthonians and Tsathoggua packs of Call of Cthulhu Miniatures in The Space Gamer No. 76. Ross commented that "As there are no human figures among these releases (maybe in a digestive tract or two . . .), it would seem that these monstrosities will only be of interest to Cthulhu collectors and gamers. Those folks should be more than happy with these unearthly beauties."

Call of Cthulhu was awarded the Origins Award for "Best Fantasy or Science Fiction Figure Series of 1983".

References

See also
List of lines of miniatures

Call of Cthulhu (role-playing game)
Miniature figures
Origins Award winners